Michael Kelly (born 13 July 1996) is an Irish professional footballer who plays for English club Carlisle United, as a goalkeeper.

Career
Kelly played youth football for Cherry Orchard and Dunboyne. He then played senior football in the League of Ireland for Shamrock Rovers II, Shamrock Rovers, Cabinteely, Longford Town, Bohemians and Bray Wanderers, before signing for English club Carlisle United on 30 July 2022.

Career statistics

References

1996 births
Living people
Republic of Ireland association footballers
Cherry Orchard F.C. players
Dunboyne A.F.C. players
Shamrock Rovers F.C. players
Cabinteely F.C. players
Longford Town F.C. players
Bohemian F.C. players
Bray Wanderers F.C. players
Carlisle United F.C. players
League of Ireland players
Association football goalkeepers